Astyliasula is a genus of mantises belonging to the family Hymenopodidae.

The species of this genus are found in Southeastern Asia.

Species:

Astyliasula basinigra 
Astyliasula hoffmanni 
Astyliasula inermis 
Astyliasula javana 
Astyliasula major 
Astyliasula phyllopus 
Astyliasula sarawaca 
Astyliasula wuyshana

References

Hymenopodidae